Rodolphus Agricola (August 28, 1443, or February 17, 1444 – October 27, 1485) was a Dutch humanist of the Northern Low Countries, famous for his knowledge of Latin and Greek. He was an educator, musician, builder of church organs, a poet in Latin and the vernacular, a diplomat, a boxer and a Hebrew scholar towards the end of his life. Today, he is best known as the author of De inventione dialectica, the father of Northern European humanism and as a zealous anti-scholastic in the late fifteenth century.

Biography 

Agricola was born in Baflo in the Dutch province of Groningen as the illegitimate son of the cleric and future abbot Hendrik Vries and Zycka Huesman, a rich farmer's daughter. He was originally named Roelof Huesman, or Huisman, his mother's surname. The Latin adjective Phrisius identifies him as a Frisian.

Educated first by the school of St. Maarten in Groningen, Agricola matriculated at the University of Erfurt with his father's assistance and received a BA in 1458. He then studied at Louvain University, receiving an MA in 1465; he was renowned for the purity of his Latin and skill in disputation. He concentrated his studies on Cicero and Quintilian, but also added French and Greek to his ever-growing list of languages during his university years. At the end of his life, he would learn Hebrew to be able to read the Old Testament, especially the Psalms, unadulterated by translation.

In the 1460s Agricola travelled to Italy, where he became associated with humanist masters and statesmen. From circa 1468 until 1475, he studied civil law at the University of Pavia and later went to Ferrara (1475–1479). There, he became the protégé of Prince d'Este of Ferrara, and was a pupil of Theodor Gaza and attended lectures by Battista Guarino. He devoted himself to the study of classical texts and gained fame for the elegance of his Latin style and his knowledge of philosophy. While in Ferrara, Agricola gained formal employment as the organist to the opulent ducal chapel. He held that post until 1479, after which he returned to the North, becoming secretary to the city of Groningen. Here, at the Cistercian Abbey of St Bernard at Aduard, near Groningen, and at 's-Heerenbergh near Emmerich in the south-east, he was at the center of a group of scholars and humanists, with whom he kept up a lively exchange of letters. His correspondents included the musician and choirmaster of Antwerp Jacobus Barbirianus (Barbireau), rector of the Latin School at Deventer Alexander Hegius von Heek and Johannes Reuchlin, the humanist scholar and later student of Hebrew.

In 1470, he taught a deaf child how to communicate orally and in writing; his work, De inventione dialectica, documents this pioneering educational effort.

Once in Germany again, he spent time in Dillingen, where he continued to correspond with humanist friends and colleagues throughout Europe. In correspondence, he primarily advocated for his project to promote the study of classical learning and the Studia humanitatis. Agricola remained an independent scholar, unattached to a university or religious establishment. This independence became a hallmark of humanist scholars. In 1479, Agricola completed his De inventione dialectica (On Dialectical Invention) in Dillingen, which argued for the precise application of loci in scholarly argumentation.

From 1480 to 1484 he held the post of secretary of the city of Groningen.

In 1481, Agricola spent six months in Brussels at the court of Archduke Maximilian (later Maximilian I, the Holy Roman Emperor). Friends attempted to dissuade him from accepting the archduke's patronage as they feared that the archduke's influence would undermine his philosophical ideals. He also declined the offer to become the head of a Latin school at Antwerp.

In 1484, Agricola moved to Heidelberg by invitation of Johann Von Dalberg, the Bishop of Worms. The two men had met in Pavia, and they became close friends in Heidelberg. The bishop was a generous benefactor of learning. At this time Agricola began studying Hebrew, and he is said to have published an original translation of the Psalms.

In 1485, Dalberg was sent as an ambassador to Pope Innocent VIII in Rome, with Agricola accompanying him; the latter was struck gravely ill on their journey. He died shortly after their return to Heidelberg and Ermolao Barbaro composed an epitaph for him.

Legacy 

De inventione dialectica was influential in creating a place for logic in rhetorical studies and was of significance in the education of early humanists. It was a critical and systematic treatment of ideas and concepts related to dialectics.

The significance of De inventione dialectica for the history of argumentation is that it assimilated the art of dialectic to that of rhetoric. Argumentation focused not on truth but on what might be said with reason. Accordingly, Agricola focused on the Topics rather than the Analytics of Aristotle and on Cicero, but also on the writings of historians, poets, and orators. Thus, for Agricola, dialectic was an open field; the art of finding "whatever can be said with any degree of probability on any subject." (Hamilton, David. From Dialectic to Didactic).

Agricola was also important to the deaf community, since he believed that people who are born deaf can express themselves by putting their thoughts into writing. His statement that deaf people can be taught a language is one of the earliest positive statements about deafness on record (Gannon, 1981).

Agricola's De formando studio—his long letter on a private educational program—was printed as a small booklet and influenced pedagogy of the early sixteenth century.

Agricola was also important for his personal influence over others. Erasmus admired Agricola, eulogizing him in "Adagia" and calling him "the first to bring a breath of better literature from Italy." Erasmus claimed him as a father/teacher figure and may have met him through his own schoolmaster Alexander Hegius (most probably one of Agricola's students) at Hegius's School in Deventer. In addition to Hegius, Agricola's students include Conrad Celtis (in Heidelberg).

Erasmus made it his personal mission to ensure that several of Agricola's major works were printed posthumously. Agricola's literary executor was Adolphus Occo, a physician of Augsburg. By about 1530 disciples and followers had gathered the manuscripts left by Agricola, and these were edited by Alardus of Amsterdam.

Works 
 De Inventione Dialectica libri tres (1479): This is the work for which Agricola is particularly known. There is a modern edition (and translation into German) by Lothar Mundt, Rudolf Agricola. De inventione dialectica libri tres (Tübingen: Niemeyer, 1992).
 Letters: The letters of Agricola, of which fifty-one survive, offer an interesting insight into the humanist circle to which he belonged. They have been published and translated with extensive notes in: Agricola, Letters; edited by Adrie van der Laan and Fokke Akkerman (2002).
 A Life of Petrarch (Vita Petrarcae / De vita Petrarchae, 1477)
 De nativitate Christi
 De formando studio (= letter 38 [to Jacobus Barbireau of Antwerp on June 7, 1484, when Agricola was in Heidelberg]: see the edition of the letters by Van der Laan / Akkerman, pp. 200–219)
 His minor works include some speeches, poems, translations of Greek dialogues, and commentaries on works by Seneca, Boethius and Cicero
 For a selection of his works with facing French translation: Rodolphe Agricola, Écrits sur la dialectique et l'humanisme, ed. Marc van der Poel (Paris: Honoré Champion, 1997)
 For a bibliography of Agricola's works: Gerda C. Huisman, Rudolph Agricola. A Bibliography of Printed Works and Translations (Nieuwkoop: B. de Graaf, 1985)

References

Sources 
 Agricola, R., from "Three Books Concerning Dialectical Invention." Renaissance Debates on Rhetoric. ed. & trans. W.A. Rebhorn. pp. 42–56. Ithaca, NY: Cornell U P. 2000.
 Gallaudet University Library: - Earliest Known Deaf People:  https://web.archive.org/web/20051220092919/http://library.gallaudet.edu/dr/faq-earliest-deaf.html
 Hamilton, David. "From Dialectic to Didactic." http://faculty.ed.uiuc.edu/westbury/textcol/HAMILTO1.html
 The History Guide - Renaissance Humanism: http://www.historyguide.org/intellect/humanism.html
 New Advent Catholic Encyclopedia - Rudolph Agricola: http://www.newadvent.org/cathen/01231b.htm
 Rodolphus Agricola Phrisius (1444–1485). Proceedings of the International Conference at the University of Groningen 28–30 October 1985, eds. Fokke Akkerman and Arjo Vanderjagt (Leiden: Brill, 1988).
 Wessel Gansfort (1419–1489) and Northern Humanism, eds. Fokke Akkerman, Gerda Huisman, and Arjo Vanderjagt (Leiden: Brill, 1993).
 Rudolf Agricola 1444-1485. Protagonist des nordeuropäischen Humanismus zum 550. Geburtstag, ed. Wilhelm Kühlman (Bern: Peter Lang, 1994).
 Northern Humanism in European Context. From the 'Adwert Academy' to Ubbo Emmius, ed. Fokke Akkerman, Arjo Vanderjagt, and Adrie van der Laan (Leiden: Brill, 1999).
 Agricola's logic and rhetoric are treated in Peter Mack, Renaissance Argument. Valla and Agricola in the Traditions of Rhetoric and Dialectic, (Leiden: Brill, 1993); see also Ann Moss, Renaissance Truth and the Latin Language Turn (Oxford: Oxford University Press, 2003.
 For Agricola's knowledge of Hebrew: A.J. Vanderjagt, 'Wessel Gansfort (1419–1489) and Rudolph Agricola (1443?-1485): Piety and Hebrew', in Frömmigkeit - Theologie - Frömmigkeitstheologie: Contributions to European Church History. Festschrift für Berndt Hamm zum 60. Geburtstag, ed. Gudrun Litz, Heidrun Munzert, and Roland Liebenberg (Leiden: Brill, 2005), pp. 159–172.

Further reading 

1443 births
1485 deaths
15th-century Dutch philosophers
Dutch musicians
Dutch Renaissance humanists
Dutch rhetoricians
Dutch Roman Catholics
People from Winsum
15th-century Latin writers
15th-century jurists